Aboubacar Bangoura (born 1 January 1982) is a Guinean former international footballer who played as a goalkeeper. Bangoura represented Guinea at the 2006 Africa Cup of Nations.
His first, and to date only, game for the Guinea national team was a 2:3 loss against Senegal at the African Nations Cup in 2006.

References

External links
 

1982 births
Living people
Guinean footballers
Guinea international footballers
Association football goalkeepers